Yashpal Sharma may refer to:

 Yashpal Sharma (actor) (born 1967), Indian actor
 Yashpal Sharma (cricketer) (1954–2021), Indian cricketer